This is a list of ships of the Royal Navy which have had names associated with saints.

St

HMS St Fermin

HMS St Jean d'Acre

HMS St Michael

San and Santa

See also